Makarovo is a rural locality (a selo) and the administrative center of Makarovsky Selsoviet, Shelabolikhinsky District, Altai Krai, Russia. The population was 479 as of 2013. There are 7 streets.

Geography 
Makarovo is located 51 km southwest of Shelabolikha (the district's administrative centre) by road. Ust-Mosikha is the nearest rural locality.

References 

Rural localities in Shelabolikhinsky District